Garland Arthur "Gardie" or "Pinky" Grange (December 2, 1906 – May 28, 1981) was a professional American football player for the Chicago Bears from 1929 until 1931. Prior to his professional playing career, he played college football at the University of Illinois. He was the younger brother of, Illinois and Bears' star, Red Grange. In 1932 he served as the head coach for the independent St. Louis Veterans and Memphis Tigers.

References

Further reading
 
 

1906 births
1981 deaths
People from Sullivan County, Pennsylvania
Sportspeople from Wheaton, Illinois
Players of American football from Illinois
American football ends
American football halfbacks
Illinois Fighting Illini football players
Chicago Bears players
Coaches of American football from Illinois